Los Jaivas is a Chilean musical group who perform in folk, rock, psychedelic, and progressive rock styles formed in 1963 in Viña Del Mar, Chile. They are considered one of the most important and influential artists of all time in Latin America.

History
The origins of Los Jaivas can be found in the family nucleus made up of the brothers Eduardo, Claudio and Gabriel Parra, from Viña del Mar. Together with their friends and classmates from high school at the Liceo Guillermo Rivera Cotapos, located on Calle Montaña (a few steps de la Quinta Vergara), Los Jaivas appeared in Chilean music in August 15, 1963, under the name of The High & Bass as a progressive-rock-andino group, mixing rock with South American ancestral music. This name was proposed by Rolando Fuentes (a friend of founding member Claudio Parra during high school). 

At that time in Chile, it was customary to use English names for musical bands. Another source indicates that the name is a reference to the members differences in height, since the word in Spanish for bass guitar is the same as that for short (bajo). Another source explains the name as a reference to the bass guitar played at a very high volume compared to the other instruments. During the following six years, and with its stable formation (Eduardo on keyboards, Claudio on accordion and piano, Gabriel on drums, Gato on guitar and Mario on bass) the band develops its musical proposal at parties and social gatherings in Viña del Mar, mainly performing music tropical, cha cha cha, bossa nova and boleros, with good results.

They quickly realized that an English-sounding name was not appropriate for a folk band, so they changed it to Jaivas (HIGH-BASS), a "Chileanized" pronunciation of "high bass" which ignores the fact that bass (the musical instrument) rhymes with base and lace in English, as opposed to the word bass (the fish) which rhymes with cass and lass, which is how the syllable vas is pronounced in the band's name. The spelling of Jaivas is a misspelling of the word jaibas, which means crabs in Spanish. 

Between 1970 and 1971, and with its Spanishized name "Los Jaivas", the group's concerts became absolute improvisations, without scripts or prepared schemes, and with each musical instrument generating its own atmosphere, even with the help of the audience. Improvisation leads them to the appreciation of Latin American musical roots and to the exploration of the sounds of ancestral instruments, which allows them to combine apparently irreconcilable styles, but which Los Jaivas decide to capture in their subsequent musical creation.

Several concerts from this time, including those held at the Vanguard Music Festival of Viña del Mar (January 1970), the Sala de la Reforma of the Faculty of Musical Arts and Sciences of the University of Chile (May 1970), the Cine Arte de Viña del Mar (June 1970) and the Park of the Cultural Institute of Las Condes (May 1970), in addition to the soundtrack prepared for a film that was never made (¿Qué Hacer? by Raúl Ruiz, soundtrack recorded in October 1970), are reflected in the five-disc collection entitled La Vorágine, which documents the stage known as the Prehistory of Los Jaivas.

During this time, in addition, the group participates in the mythical Red Stone Festival and records its first official record label, homonymous, but known as El Volantín, due to its characteristic cover. The album, released in 1971, contains improvisations along the lines of the avant-garde explored previously, but it also includes the first compositional sketches, especially on songs like "Foto de Primera Comunión" and "Que o la Tumba Seras".

The band took refuge in Argentina after the military dictatorship took over in Chile. In 1977, they headed to France, where they resided for a long time. The first major change in the band occurred in 1988 when Gabriel died in Peru in a car crash. His daughter Juanita took his place behind the drums. In January 2003, the main singer, Gato Alquinta, died in Coquimbo, Chile, of a heart attack while swimming in the sea. Gato's three sons soon joined the band to replace him: Ankatu (guitar), Eloy (saxophone) and Aurora (vocals). Aurora left shortly after, and Eloy died of a heart attack in 2004. Ankatu, however, is still a member of the band.

Among various other activities, in 2006 the group performed a historic concert on Easter Island, in addition to the Chilean Navy orchestra, and as part of the celebrations for the month of the sea. On September 20, 2006, Canal 13 broadcasts the television special Los Jaivas en Rapa Nui: Ojos Que Miran el Universo, which includes fragments of the recital, as well as interviews with the group and with inhabitants of the Island. The DVD that includes the event It was finally launched on the market in November 2007 under the title of Los Jaivas en Rapa Nui. On March 22, 2011 Los Jaivas make a presentation in tribute to the then American president Barack Obama in the courtyard of Los Cañones of the Palacio de La Moneda.

Homage 
The band celebrated its 50th anniversary in an open concert on the front of the National Museum of Fine Arts of Santiago de Chile. Special guests were Inti Illimani, Los Tres and Congreso among others. The concert attracted a multitude of over 60,000 people, causing mayor upheaval in the city, and the police had to intervene with water cannons.

Biopic 
In March 2013, the same year as the celebration of the band's 50th anniversary, Chilean-Dutch filmmaker Erasmo de la Parra (son of Claudio Parra) convinced the musicians to make a biopic based on the band's formative years. The film would be set in the 1960s in Viña del Mar, from the time they were known as "The High Bass" to the time they became known as "Los Jaivas". The director revealed on the film's official Facebook page that the production would have gone through long negotiations with Netflix, but that the production house eventually chose other projects. The film, titled The High Bass, is in pre-production with an unknown release date, and with the participation of Belgian, Dutch, and British producers.

Members
Alan Reale (guitar, vocals)
Juanita Parra (drums)
Mario Mutis (vocals, electric guitar, bass, percussion)
Claudio Parra (piano, vocals)
Francisco Bosco (saxophone, organ)
Carlos Cabezas (charango, vocals, violin, flute)

Former members
Ankatu Alquinta (vocals, guitar)
Gabriel Parra † (drums)
Eduardo "Gato" Alquinta † (vocals, guitar)
Eduardo Parra (organ, percussion)
Eloy Alquinta † (vocals, saxophone, percussion)
Aurora Alquinta (vocals)
Carlos Edumuybueno (guitar)
Julio Anderson (bass)
Carlos Canzani (bass, guitar)
Alberto Ledo (charango, quena)
Marcelo Muñoz (drums)
Fernando Flores (bass)

Discography
El Volantín 1971
Todos juntos 1972
La Ventana 1973
Palomita blanca (Movie soundtrack) 1973 (Released in 1992)
Sueños de América 1974 (Released in 1979)
Los Jaivas (El indio) 1975
Canción Del Sur 1977
Mambo de Machaguay (Compilation) 1978
Alturas de Macchu Picchu (based on lyrics from The Heights of Macchu Picchu by Pablo Neruda) 1981
Aconcagua 1982
Obras de Violeta Parra 1984
Si tu no estás 1989
Hijos de la Tierra 1995
Trilogia: El Rencuentro 1997
Mamalluca 1999
En El Bar-Restaurant Lo Que Nunca Se Supo (Compilation) 2000
Los Jaivas En Concierto: Gira Chile 2000 (Live) 2000
Arrebol 2001
Obras Cumbres (Compilation) 2003
La Vorágine I, Pan Negro (Improvisations 1969-70) 2003
La Vorágine II, La Reforma (Improvisations 1969-70) 2003
La Vorágine III, El Tótem (Improvisations 1969-70) 2003
La Vorágine IV, Mucha Intensidad (Improvisations 1969-70) 2003
La Vorágine V, ¿Qué Hacer? (Improvisations 1969-70) 2003
Serie de Oro: Grandes Exitos (Compilation) 2004

External links
  
 Los Jaivas biography and discography
 Official Los Jaivas music store

References 

Chilean rock music groups
Nueva canción musicians
Rock en Español music groups